Sanan Suleymanov is an Azerbaijani Greco-Roman wrestler. He won the silver medal in the 77 kg event at the 2021 World Wrestling Championships held in Oslo, Norway. In 2020, he won the gold medal in the 77 kg event at the European Wrestling Championships held in Rome, Italy.

Career 

He competed in the 66 kg event at the 2017 European Wrestling Championships held in Novi Sad, Serbia without winning a medal. He won his first match against Parviz Nasibov of Ukraine but he was eliminated from the competition by Atakan Yüksel of Turkey.

In 2019, he competed in the 72 kg event at the World Wrestling Championships held in Nur-Sultan, Kazakhstan without winning a medal. At the 2019 World U23 Wrestling Championship held in Budapest, Hungary, he won the silver medal in the 72 kg event. In the final, he lost against Mohammad Reza Geraei of Iran. In 2020, he competed in the men's 77 kg event at the Individual Wrestling World Cup held in Belgrade, Serbia.

In March 2021, he competed at the European Qualification Tournament in Budapest, Hungary hoping to qualify for the 2020 Summer Olympics in Tokyo, Japan. In April 2021, he won one of the bronze medals in the 77 kg event at the European Wrestling Championships held in Warsaw, Poland.

In 2022, he won the silver medal in his event at the Vehbi Emre & Hamit Kaplan Tournament held in Istanbul, Turkey. He won one of the bronze medals in the 77 kg event at the European Wrestling Championships held in Budapest, Hungary. He won the silver medal in his event at the 2021 Islamic Solidarity Games held in Konya, Turkey.

He competed in the 77kg event at the 2022 World Wrestling Championships held in Belgrade, Serbia.

Achievements

References

External links 

 

Living people
Year of birth missing (living people)
Place of birth missing (living people)
Azerbaijani male sport wrestlers
European Wrestling Championships medalists
World Wrestling Championships medalists
European Wrestling Champions
Islamic Solidarity Games medalists in wrestling
Islamic Solidarity Games competitors for Azerbaijan
21st-century Azerbaijani people